JNJ-10397049 is a potent and highly selective OX2 receptor antagonist. In animals, JNJ-10397049 was found to have sleep-promoting effects and to attenuate the reinforcing effects of ethanol.

References

Bromoarenes
Dioxanes
Orexin antagonists
Ureas